Paul Aksel Johansen (born  in Bjugn) is a Norwegian wheelchair curler and sport shooter.

He represents Trondheim Curling Club and Ørland Pistol Club.

He is in a wheelchair, after he broke his neck in a car accident in May 2000.

He started playing wheelchair curling in 2003. As a wheelchair curler he participated at the 2006 Winter Paralympics where Norwegian team came in 4th place.

He began sport shooting in 2008. During the 2012 Summer Paralympics, he participated in shooting 10 meters of air rifle and 50 meters of rifle lying. In the 10 meter air rifle, he came in 37th place in the qualification, with 592 points, and did not reach the final. Lying on a rifle, he came in 35th place in the qualification, and did not reach the final here either.

During the 2016 Summer Paralympics, he participated in mixed 10 m air rifle prone SH1 (came in 28th place with 627.2 points) and mixed 50 m air rifle prone SH1 (came in 16th place with 611.3 points).

He was qualified to represent Norway at the 2020 Summer Paralympics in shooting (R6 - Mixed 50m Rifle Prone SH1).

Wheelchair curling teams and events

References

External links 
 
 
 

Living people
1973 births
People from Bjugn
Norwegian male curlers
Norwegian wheelchair curlers
Norwegian disabled sportspeople
Paralympic wheelchair curlers of Norway
Wheelchair curlers at the 2006 Winter Paralympics
Norwegian male sport shooters
Paralympic rifle shooters
Paralympic shooters of Norway
Shooters at the 2012 Summer Paralympics
Shooters at the 2016 Summer Paralympics
Shooters at the 2020 Summer Paralympics
Sportspeople from Trøndelag